prEVOLVEr is a mixtape by American R&B singer T-Pain. The prequel to his album, RevolveR, the mixtape was released on May 4, 2011, for free download on the Nappy Boy website. The mixtape contains 30 tracks with guest appearances from Lil Wayne, Birdman, 2 Chainz, Krizz Kaliko, Bow Wow, Mistah Fab, Field Mob, Brisco, One Chance and others.

Background
T-Pain held many contest during the time of recording prEVOLVEr, the motivated contest ran for months until rappers B.Martin and P.L Official won. T-Pain later held another contest for his song "Merry Christmas", but the song ended up not being on the mixtape. After months of leaks including the song "You Copying Me", T-Pain officially released prEVOLVEr on May 4, 2011.

Track list

References

T-Pain albums
2011 mixtape albums
Albums produced by Tha Bizness
Albums produced by T-Pain
Albums produced by Lil' C (record producer)
Albums produced by DJ Khalil
Albums produced by Lee Major
Albums produced by Don Cannon